Jacob Frederick Fletcher (born 16 May 2000) is an English professional footballer who plays as a midfielder.

Club career
Fletcher is a Doncaster Rovers youth prospect, having joined the Academy in November 2012. He made his professional debut on 3 October 2017, starting in a 1–0 EFL Trophy home win against Sunderland U21.

Fletcher made his League One debut on 7 October 2017, coming on as a late substitute for Jordan Houghton in a 4–1 home routing of Southend United.

He was awarded a professional contract with Rovers at the beginning of May 2018.

References

External links

2000 births
Living people
English footballers
Association football midfielders
English Football League players
Doncaster Rovers F.C. players